Edward Joseph Mahoney (March 21, 1949September 13, 2019), known professionally as Eddie Money, was an American singer and songwriter who, in the 1970s and 1980s, had eleven Top 40 songs, including "Baby Hold On", "Two Tickets to Paradise", "Think I'm in Love", "Shakin'", "Take Me Home Tonight", "I Wanna Go Back", "Walk on Water", and "The Love in Your Eyes". Critic Neil Genzlinger of The New York Times called him a working-class rocker and Kristin Hall of the Associated Press stated he had a husky voice. In 1987, he was nominated for a Grammy Award for Best Male Rock Vocal Performance for "Take Me Home Tonight".

Early life 

Edward Joseph Mahoney was born in Brooklyn, New York City on March 21, 1949, to a large family of Irish Catholics. His parents were Dorothy Elizabeth, a homemaker, and Daniel Patrick Mahoney, a police officer. He grew up in Levittown, New York, but spent some teenage years in Woodhaven, Queens. Money was a street singer since the age of eleven. As a teenager, he played in rock bands, in part to get dates from cheerleaders. He was thrown out of one high school for forging a report card. In 1967, he graduated from Island Trees High School.

At the age of 18, he tried to follow in the footsteps of his grandfather, father, and brother as a New York City Police Department trainee. However, after working as a clerk and typist, he left in 1968 to pursue a career in music, as the police did not allow him to grow his hair long. "I couldn't see myself in a police uniform for 20 years of my life, with short hair," he later said. His bandmates also fired him because they did not want a police officer in the group. His father was not happy with the decision to play music and tore the Jimi Hendrix posters from his wall.

In 1968, Money moved to Berkeley, California. There, he studied with vocal coach Judy Davis, and took on the stage name Eddie Money, dropping a few letters from his name and sarcastically referring to the fact that he was always broke (some people called him "Eddie no money").

Career

Music career 

Money became a regular performer at clubs in the San Francisco Bay Area. After gaining the attention of Bill Graham, he secured a recording contract with Columbia Records, releasing his debut album in 1977. He charted with singles such as "Baby Hold On" and "Two Tickets to Paradise", about visiting his girlfriend despite not having money.

In 1978, Money opened for Santana at Boston's Music Hall. The following year, he sang backing vocals on the bridge section on "I'm Alright", a song written and performed by Kenny Loggins. In 2014, Money claimed that Loggins never gave him credit for his contribution.

In 1982, Money took advantage of the MTV music video scene with his humorous narrative videos for "Think I'm in Love", performed at The Mission Inn Hotel & Spa, and "Shakin'". In the early 1980s, he appeared on The Midnight Special, Fridays, and Solid Gold. In 1978 and 1984, he appeared on American Bandstand.

Money's career began to decline following an unsuccessful 1983 album (Where's the Party?) However, he made a comeback in 1986 with the album Can't Hold Back, which received a music recording certification of platinum. "Take Me Home Tonight", a single from the album, peaked at No. 4 on the Billboard Hot 100 chart in the United States. Money only agreed to perform the songwhich included a line from "Be My Baby", a song Ronnie Spector performed as part of The Ronettesafter Spector agreed to sing the line herself. In 1987, Money was nominated for a Grammy Award for Best Male Rock Vocal Performance for "Take Me Home Tonight". "I Wanna Go Back" and "Endless Nights"two other singles from the Can't Hold Back albumpeaked at No. 14 and No. 21, respectively.

In 1988, Money released Nothing to Lose, which featured the Top 10 hit "Walk on Water" and the Top 40 hit "The Love in Your Eyes".

Beginning in 1992, Money opened the summer concert season for the Pine Knob Music Theater in Clarkston, Michigan where he would return to open the venue for 27 consecutive years. In 1996, he wrote the theme music to Quack Pack, a Disney cartoon.

Money was inducted into the Long Island Music Hall of Fame in 2008. In January 2010, he performed a medley of his hit singles during the halftime performance at the Liberty Bowl.

Money wrote and performed original songs for the films Americathon (1979), Over the Top, Back to the Beach (both 1987), and Kuffs (1992), along with the television series Hardball (19891990).

In the three days following Money's death, fans streamed "Take Me Home Tonight" more than 3.1million times, which was an increase of 349 percent compared to the previous three-day period. Fans also streamed his other songs by 931 percent more than the three previous days.

Television, film, and radio career 

Money made several screen appearances.

In 1997, he appeared in Wonderland, a documentary film about Levittown, New York, where Money went to high school. In the film, he said if he had "two tickets to paradise, I'd probably get back to Levittown".

Money played a fictionalized version of himself on a 1999 episode of season 5 of The Drew Carey Show. In the episode, he had been Mimi's first husband early in his career and they never made their divorce official. In May 2002, he played himself on an episode of the sitcom The King of Queens.

In October 2011, Money became the host of "Money in the Morning", a radio show on WSRV. The gig lasted about three months. He appeared in a 2012 GEICO insurance commercial in which he is depicted as a travel agency owner who sings "Two Tickets to Paradise" to a family that wants tickets for a vacation.

In January 2016, Money partnered with Howard Perl Entertainment, MTV VJ Nina Blackwood, and Hard Rock Rocksino to produce "Money for the Animals", a show designed to raise funds and adopt rescue animals in need.

In 2018, Money appeared in episode 6 of The Kominsky Method as a fictionalized version of himself who is indebted to the Internal Revenue Service and portrays the character Freddie Money in an eponymous tribute act at a casino to avoid further tax problems.

On April 8, 2018, Real Money, a reality television series about Money and his family, debuted on AXS TV. An episode sharing his cancer diagnosis aired on AXS TV the day before he died. The show's second season was expected to follow Money's "journey as he tells his family about the disease and undergoes treatment."

In late April 2018, Weekly Alibi's August March interviewed Money, who waxed poetic about his career, his family, and his new television show.

Personal life and death 

In 1980, after drinking vodka, Money overdosed on a synthetic barbiturate that he mistook for cocaine. He suffered damage to the sciatic nerve on his left leg, was unable to walk for months, and had a permanent limp thereafter.

On Valentine's Day 1984 in Moraga, California, Money married Margo Lee Walker, a student from Los Angeles. Money and his bride tried to keep the wedding private, "but a crowd of screaming teenage fans showed up."

Money married Laurie Harris in 1989. Together, they had five children: Zachary, Jessica, Joseph, Julian, and Desmond. They were married for 30 years and had renewed their vows three months before his death.

In March 2000, Money purchased a home in Westlake Village, California, where he lived with his family. At one point in the early 2000s, Money also had a home in Island Estates, a gated community in Palm Coast, Florida, which he called "my place to play golf, be creative, go fishing, go surfing and have fun".

In 2001, Money joined a 12-step program to deal with his drinking and made a promise to his wife and children that he would change. In 2003, he reported that he was clean and sober.

In July 2019, Money underwent a minimally invasive heart valve replacement surgery and developed pneumonia, causing him to cancel tour dates. He had been a cigarette smoker for years. On August 24, 2019, he revealed that he had been diagnosed with stage 4 esophageal cancer. Complications from the cancer resulted in his death at Keck Hospital of USC in Los Angeles on September 13, 2019, at age 70. A year later, his family filed a lawsuit alleging wrongful death against the hospital, with an additional allegation of medical malpractice.

Discography

Studio albums
 Eddie Money (1977)
 Life for the Taking (1978)
 Playing for Keeps (1980)
 No Control (1982)
 Where's the Party? (1983)
 Can't Hold Back (1986)
 Nothing to Lose (1988)
 Right Here (1991)
 Love and Money (1995)
 Ready Eddie (1999)
 Wanna Go Back (2007)

References

External links 

 
 
 
 

1949 births
2019 deaths
20th-century American singers
20th-century American male singers
21st-century American singers
21st-century American male singers
American people of Irish descent
American rock guitarists
American rock singers
Deaths from cancer in California
Deaths from esophageal cancer
Guitarists from New York (state)
Musicians from Brooklyn
Participants in American reality television series
People from Seaford, New York